Darci Frigo is a Brazilian land reform activist. In 2001, he was awarded the Robert F. Kennedy Human Rights Award.

References

Living people
Brazilian activists
Year of birth missing (living people)
Place of birth missing (living people)
Robert F. Kennedy Human Rights Award laureates